April Fairfield is an American politician from the state of North Dakota. She is a member of the Democratic Party.

Fairfield served in the North Dakota House of Representatives from 1996 to 2002, and the North Dakota State Senate from 2002 to 2006. She currently works as the executive director of the Head Injury Association of North Dakota, a nonprofit group.

Fairfield ran for Secretary of State of North Dakota in the 2014 election.

Fairfield and her husband, Steve DeLap, have a daughter, Kennedy, who was born in March 2001.

References

External links

Living people
Women state legislators in North Dakota
Democratic Party North Dakota state senators
American nonprofit executives
Year of birth missing (living people)
Place of birth missing (living people)
Women nonprofit executives
21st-century American women
Democratic Party members of the North Dakota House of Representatives